Aarya is an Indian crime-thriller drama streaming television series on Disney+ Hotstar, co-created by Ram Madhvani and Sandeep Modi, who also directed the series, with Vinod Rawat, serving as the co-director. Produced by Madhvani under the banner Ram Madhvani Films, along with Endemol Shine Group, it stars Sushmita Sen in the titular role and is based on the Dutch drama series Penoza. The series is about Aarya, an independent woman who seeks to protect her family and joins a mafia gang in order to get revenge for her husband's murder. Recently, the show has been nominated for International Emmy Awards for best Drama series.

Madhvani bought the remake rights to the series in early 2011, and planned to adapt it into a feature film in 2014. However the film was eventually shelved due to casting and budgetary issues. He decided later to direct it instead as a web series for Hotstar's original content label Hotstar Specials. Filming for the first season began in December 2019 and ended in March 2020, with the series been filmed across Mumbai, Jaipur, Udaipur and Palgadh. The cinematography is handled by Harshvir Oberoi and editing was done by Khushboo Raj and Abhimanyu Chaudhary. Vishal Khurana composed the background score.

Aarya was initially slated to release on 29 March 2020, but was postponed due to delay in post-production work. It was released on Disney+ Hotstar on 19 June 2020. The series marked the comeback of Sushmita Sen, as well as her digital debut. It has received positive reviews with critics praising Sen's performance. Sen received the award for Best Actress – Female, at the Filmfare OTT Awards, with the series receiving eight nominations. In July 2020, Sushmita Sen and Ram Madhvani announced the second season of the series. The second season started filming on 1 March 2021 in Jaipur, but having been delayed due to the COVID-19 pandemic wrapped up in June 2021. Season 2 was premiered on 10 December 2021.

Premise 
The story of Aarya revolves around Aarya Sareen, who is a caring mother and a loving wife. She is quite naïve however, and is unaware of the illegal business her husband is a part of. Things go bad for their family after Aarya's husband Tej Sareen, a pharma baron, is mysteriously killed. The drug mafia and illegal syndicates seek the death of his entire family. In response Aarya joins the gangs. The show traces her journey in becoming the mafia queen who seeks revenge against those who killed her husband. While doing so, she also takes care of her three kids.

Cast 
 Sushmita Sen as Aarya Sareen (Main Character), Udayveer and Rajeshwari's daughter, Tej's Widow, Sangram and Saundarya's half-sister and Veer, Arundhati and Aditya's mother
 Chandrachur Singh as Tej Sareen, Aarya's husband and Arundhati, Veer and Aditya's father (Season 1, cameo in Season 2) 
 Sikandar Kher as Daulat, Rathore's Loyal Hitman
 Ankur Bhatia as Sangram Singh Rathore, Aarya's half brother, Hina's Love Interest, Tej's business-partner and Jeet's father 
 Alexx ONell as Bob Wilson, Saundarya's Husband (Season 1)
 Namit Das as Jawahar Bishnoi, Maya's husband and Tej's Business Partner (Season 1) 
 Manish Choudhary as Shekhawat, Udayveer's son, Aarya's half-brother (Season 1) 
 Akash Khurana as Udayveer Shekhawat, Shekhawat and Nandini's father (Season 2) 
 Viren Vazirani as Veer Sareen, Aarya & Tej's 1st Child
 Virti Vaghani as Arundhati Sareen (Aru), Aarya & Tej's 2nd Child
 Pratyaksh Panwar as Aditya Sareen (Adi), Aarya & Tej's 3rd Child
 Sugandha Garg as Hina Khan, Aarya and Maya's best friend, Sangram's love interest, Jeet's mother
 Priyasha Bhardwaj as Saundarya Singh Rathore - Wilson, Aarya's half sister, Bob's Wife 
 Sohaila Kapur as Rajeshwari Singh Rathore, Aarya, Sangram and Saundarya's mother
 Jayant Kripalani as Zorawar Singh Rathore, Rajeshwari's husband, Aarya's step father, Sangram and Saundarya's father 
 Maya Sarao as Maya Bishnoi, Aarya and Hina's best friend, Jawahar's wife
 Vishwajeet Pradhan as Sampat, Shekhawat's former loyal Hitman
 Vikas Kumar as ACP Younus Khan
 Nishank Verma as Ajay Sharma (ACP Khan's Boyfriend)
 Lavishka Gupta as Reva, Udayveer Shekhawat's granddaughter and Nandini - Sooraj's daughter (Season 2)
 Jagdish Purohit as Bhairon Singh (Season 1)
 Flora Saini as Radhika "Rads" , Zorawar's girlfriend (Season 1)
 Joy Sengupta as Indrajeet Sarkar
 Gargi Sawant as Pallavi, Veer's girlfriend (Season 1)
 Richard Bhakti Klein as Larry Wilson, Bob's father
 Girish Sharma, as Rajasthani businessman who was interested in buying Tej's factory
 Dilnaz Irani as Advocate Shefali Gupta

Episodes

Season 1 (2020)

Season 2 (2021)

Production

Pre-production 
In late 2011, Ram Madhvani was reported to adapt the Dutch drama series Penoza as a feature film in collaboration with Endemol Shine Group. In August 2014, Madhvani approached Kajol to play the lead protagonist, who initially accepted after reading the script, and Ajay Devgn's production house Ajay Devgn FFilms, backed the project on the very same month. The film initially touted to be Kajol's return to Hindi films after four years, since her last release in 2010, However, due to financial reasons, Kajol opted out of the project and Madhvani later approached Madhuri Dixit and Kareena Kapoor, to play the lead, but neither of the actress were finalized. In May 2016, Madhvani decided to revive the project with Aishwarya Rai Bachchan, who was initially approached for the film, before finalising Kajol. However, filming got shelved a month before its start.

Development 
On 15 January 2019, the streaming platform Hotstar, announced its foray to original content production exclusively for the service, with STAR India, the parent company of Hotstar, tied up with 15 Indian filmmakers including Madhvani for creating the shows for its label called Hotstar Specials. Madhvani, later approached Sushmita Sen to play the protagonist, which was later titled as Aarya. The series marked Sushmita's comeback to films after a 10-year hiatus, and also marked her debut in digital platforms.

Casting and characters 
Sushmita Sen plays the role of Aarya Sareen, a strong woman who is ready to take bold steps in order to save and protect her family. Chandrachur Singh in Aarya plays the role of Tej Sareen, whom Aarya trusts the most. His business is named as Aaryasattava Pharmaceuticals which is a front of a big illegal business of transporting medical drugs. Sikander Kher plays the role of Daulat, who is the right-hand man of Aarya's father Zorawar. Sikander stated "Daulat is very protective about Aarya and is incredibly loyal to the family. You could say he is almost like the foot soldier of the family. He stays by her side and tries to protect her from whatever comes her way." In an interview with International Business Times, Namit Das stated "I play the character of Jawahar, and he has a lot of complexities in him he is one of the most greyish characters I have ever played in my career. Only after the completion of the shoot, I understood that he (my role) has a lot of prominence in the show. There are so many layers to the character." Jayant Kripalani plays the role of Zorawar, Aarya's father. Sohaila Kapur plays the role of Aarya's mother, while Viren Vazirani, Virti Vaghani and Pratyaksh Panwar appear as Aarya's children.

Filming 
The principal photography of the series started on 9 December 2019 at Jaipur in Rajasthan. A production unit stated that Sushmita had undergone more than 30 look tests for her role in the show. The shooting of the film took place across Jaipur, Udaipur, Mumbai and Palgadh, and the show creators chose real locations instead of building sets. Some other scenes involving the court, jail and factories were shot in Mumbai, and the team selected locations that could pass off as modern-day Jaipur.

The Zorawar Haveli, which belonged to Zorawar (Jayant Kripalani's character) was recreated at the Chomu Palace Hotel situated near Jaipur, where the wedding scenes been shot. Production designer Anna Ipe stated We shot in different sections of the complex, in a way that one would normally not see in films. A lot of details were taken care of during the propping of the spaces. He has things collected from a time gone by, and is also a hunter. Hence the use of dark wood tones and warm leather gave a kind of masculinity to the space."

Ipe, stated about the picturisation of Aarya's home in Mumbai, which was completely different from the Zorawar Haveli. "We took an empty shell, and converted it into a fully functional home for Aarya’s family. The most important thing was to ensure that the home was a reconstruction of the past of these five individuals, each with their own unique personalities." The character Maya's ecletic home was shot at the Avatar Bungalow in Mumbai.

The series have been shot using 360 degree format. The format entails using multiple cameras to capture a scene at once, and freeing actors of shot and angle restrictions. This also makes it important to design things that are not seen on camera. Production on the show was wrapped on 15 March 2020.

Post-production
The post-production works were started in March 2020, before the COVID-19 pandemic lockdown in India. All the editing, VFX, sound mixing and dubbing has been done from team's respective homes. In an interview with Film Companion, Madhvani stated "It is an Excel Sheet Nightmare as the team has to go through a scheduled Excel sheet to check if they have done that work or not everyday". According to Madhvani a team of 50 people worked on the post production 18 hours a day and had connected through Zoom or Google Meet for the collaboration and lags had been a big issue for them to judge the sound correctly. Dubbing has been also a major issue according to Madhvani as the cast were scattered throughout the globe. Jayant Kripalani was in Kolkata dubbing for his role during Cyclone Amphan, and Namit Das stated that he "started dubbing at 3 am when all his dogs were quiet".

Music 

The original score of Aarya is composed by Vishal Khurana, who previously worked with Ram Madhvani in Neerja (2016), and was co-produced by Siddhanth Madhvani. "The Bhagavad Gita Song" which is inspired from the Bhagavad Gita, was the only song featured in the series, which was sung by Siddharth Basrur, Delraaz Bunshah, Anurag Panwar, with a rap portion done by actress Virti Vaghani. The original soundtrack was released on 25 June 2020, through streaming platforms. The soundtrack features eight instrumental compositions. Vishal stated "The entire soundtrack of Aarya is based on an emotion of tragedy and depicts the ominous fear that is always looming around the central characters. The approach to the soundtrack for 'Aarya' was thematic, trying to cover a wide variety of musical styles in the different themes, yet staying within the zone of the show. The use of Indian ethnic instruments is to add the rooted and cultural element to the themes, but these sounds have been played around with and distorted to keep it modern and in line with the show's urban tonality."

The thematic use of the song "Bade Achche Lage Hain", from the 1976 film Balika Vadhu, received praise from viewers. It was released through the official YouTube channel of Disney+ Hotstar on 5 July 2020. Commenting about the song, director Ram Madhvani stated in an interview with Film Companion, that "We have used the song in the script keeping in mind that Tej's (Chandrachur Singh) character loves old hindi music. This song is an absolute hit with viewers of all ages for its nostalgic and sentimental value. It is mellifluous and brings out so many emotions, the writer-director said in a statement.We wanted to strike an emotional chord with the audience with this music and decided to make it stand out by using it in a diametrically opposite fashion to the actual scene."

Release 
The series was eventually reported for a release on 29 March 2020, on Hotstar concurrent with the launch of Disney+ in India through its corporate sibling. However, the release was postponed due to post-production delays, and also the launch of Disney+ Hotstar, which scheduled to coincide with the 2020 Indian Premier League, delayed as the event got pushed due to the COVID-19 pandemic in India (eventually launched on 3 April 2020). In April 2020, the makers announced for a release in June 2020, as the post-production works may take two months to complete. The first look of the series was launched on 3 June 2020, followed by the trailer on 5 June. The series was premiered on Disney+ Hotstar on 19 June 2020. On 6 September 2020, the show was released in 6 different languages – Tamil, Telugu, Bengali, Malayalam, Marathi and Kannada.

On 1 September 2021, the series became available to stream on Hulu as part of the migration of Hotstar content to Hulu in the US.

Reception

Critical response 
The series received mostly positive response from critics, with Sushmita Sen's performance was praised by critics. Rahul Desai from Film Companion said, "Sen is the pivot of an excellent cast that, despite a brief lull in the middle overs, maintains the rhythm. The narrative fleetingly dips its toes into the hidden homes of each character. This gives each of the talented actors – otherwise underutilized by the Hindi-film ecosystem – a chance to shine." Shubhra Gupta, from The Indian Express, gave a rating of three out of five saying, "For the most part, Aarya stays on course, taut, unpredictable, pacey and enjoyable." Udita Jhunjhunwala from Firspost rated three-and-a-half out of five stars and said that, "The tone and themes of the show will resonate with those familiar with Ozark, Narcos, Breaking Bad, and, of course, Penoza, as it enters the inner sanctum of a business house with a crooked moral compass. Yet you feel strongly for this family that stays together through the crisis, making smart and foolish moves, captained by a woman who just does not give up." Pallabi Dey Purkayastha of The Times of India, rated three out of five saying, "Barring the dearth of a few much-needed Jump Cuts and Match Cuts, ‘Aarya’ stands out for reasons more than one."

Saibal Chatterjee of NDTV gave two-and-a-half out of five and stated "Sushmita Sen holds the series together with her natural ability to fill every frame with her commanding presence." Stutee Ghosh of The Quint, gave three out of five and stated "There is no denying that the world that is created is enigmatic and seduces the audience, things would have been far more enjoyable if it has been a little more pruned. Nevertheless, Aarya still has a lot going for it. watching Sushmita Sen bustle through her troubles with passionate ease is definitely of one of them." Sowmya Srivatsava of Hindustan Times commented "Aarya makes for an easy, binge-able watch that might test your patience here and there—they do show someone running up the entire staircase rather than cutting to the next scene. But persevere, and ye shall find yourself a thriller you want to stay with till the end." Nandini Ramanth of Scroll.in opined "There are many moments when Aarya feels like a very gorgeously packaged and overpriced grocery staple. Many scenes are stretched beyond repair, and the emotional moments seem overdirected."

The Hindu's Kenneth Rosario reviewed "The show, by no means, is extraordinary, yet it keeps you interested in the characters and their lives, and emerges as a good example of basic storytelling done right." India Today's Divyanshi Sharma commented "The show ends on an intriguing note, making us eager for the second season already." Raja Sen of Mint stated "The show's pulp plot could engage in itself, but Aarya focuses on its central character's motivations and limitations rather than her force". Tanul Thakur of The Wire reviewed "Aarya is a good example of solid genre fiction. It defines its goals right at the start — of being a racy, compelling thriller — and stays true to them. It may not be as ‘deep’, but it's consistently satisfying." Saraswati Datar of The News Minute reviewed "Watch Aarya for Sushmita Sen and a refreshingly new take on crime stories that have for long been a male-dominated genre. But most importantly watch it because a show with a woman and a mother of three as its protagonist is a rare treat in itself, even on a digital platform." Aishwarya Vasudevan of  Daily News and Analysis commented "Aarya is watchable but predictable, which can be touted as a mini-series with a complete justice done to the story and each character as well."

Accolades

References

External links 

Hindi-language Disney+ Hotstar original programming
2020 Indian television series debuts
Indian thriller television series
Hindi-language television shows
Indian television series based on non-Indian television series